Karen Krebsbach (born 1940) is an American politician. She is a member of the North Dakota State Senate from the 40th District, serving since 1988. She is a member of the Republican party.

References

Living people
1940 births
Republican Party North Dakota state senators
21st-century American politicians
Women state legislators in North Dakota
21st-century American women politicians